Mark "Thriller" Miller is an American former AMA superbike motorcycle racer and current road racer in the Isle of Man TT and Macau Grand Prix.

In 2010 he won the TT Zero race which replaced the 2009 format called TTXGP in which he failed to finish the course. In both events Miller rode MotoCzysz machines, winning on an updated bike designated MotoCzysz E1pc. His victory at the Isle of Man is featured in the film Charge, Zero Emissions/Maximum Speed by Mark Neale.

Miller finished 2nd in the 2011 race and 3rd in 2012, again on MotoCzysz machines. The better-placed finishers were highly experienced TT racers John McGuinness and Michael Rutter who normally competed aboard top-flight conventional petrol (US-gas) engined machines in both TT and short-circuit racing at professional level.

In the 2013 race Miller suffered mechanical failure of his MotoCzysz just after Ballaugh, close to one-half distance around the 37.733-mile one-lap road circuit, whilst his teammate Michael Rutter won at record speed.

References

Living people
Isle of Man TT riders
British Superbike Championship riders
AMA Superbike Championship riders
Superbike World Championship riders
Year of birth missing (living people)